"Banned from T.V." is a song by American rapper Noreaga, released as the third single from his debut studio album N.O.R.E. (1998). The song, produced by then up-and-coming record producer Swizz Beatz, is a posse cut featuring guest appearances from fellow New York-based rappers Nature, Big Pun, Cam'ron, Jadakiss and Styles P. The song contains a sample of "Also sprach Zarathustra", as performed by Richard Strauss.

Background
In a 2014 interview, N.O.R.E. revealed Big Pun's appearance on the song was not originally intended: "Actually, Pun bullied his way on there. I had Nature on there, and Pun was in the studio. I went to take a shit, and Pun snuck himself on there. I wanted to erase [Pun's verse] 'cause he violated. But I never did erase it. That was always my brother."

Music video
The music video for the song was directed by Director X. In 2013, nearly fifteen years later, in promotion for his sixth studio album Student of the Game, N.O.R.E. liberated behind-the-scenes footage of the music video for "Banned from T.V.".

Charts

References

1998 singles
1998 songs
Songs about television
N.O.R.E. songs
Big Pun songs
Cam'ron songs
Jadakiss songs
Styles P songs
Songs written by Jadakiss
Songs written by Swizz Beatz
Song recordings produced by Swizz Beatz
Tommy Boy Records singles
Music videos directed by Director X
Hardcore hip hop songs
Posse cuts
Songs written by Big Pun
Songs written by Cam'ron
Songs written by N.O.R.E.